This is a list of Kent County Cricket Club Twenty20 cricket records; that is, record team and individual performances in Twenty20 cricket for Kent County Cricket Club.

Kent played their first Twenty20 match in the domestic 2003 Twenty20 Cup against Hampshire at Beckenham. The club has played in each of the domestic Twenty20 competitions since, winning the competition in 2007 and 2021 and finishing as runners-up in 2008. The club plays Twenty20 cricket under the name Kent Spitfires, an allusion to the role of the Supermarine Spitfire in the Battle of Britain during 1940, much of which took place in the skies over the county. As of July 2021 the club has played over 220 Twenty20 matches, including two matches against touring international teams.

Team records 
All records last updated 5 June 2022
 Highest total for: 236/3 vs Essex at Canterbury, 2021
 Highest total against: 250/6 by Surrey at Canterbury, 2018
 Lowest total for: 72 all out vs Hampshire at The Rose Bowl, 2011
 Lowest total against: 80 all out by Middlesex at Lord's, 2021

Partnerships
The highest partnership for Kent is 207 runs scored for the 1st wicket by Daniel Bell-Drummond and Joe Denly against Essex at Chelmsford in 2017. This set a new highest first-wicket stand in all Twenty20 cricket globally and became the third highest partnership for any wicket in the form of the game and the highest in the English domestic T20 competition. It surpassed the 163 runs the same players had scored earlier in the season against Surrey at The Oval which had, in turn, bettered Kent's previous highest partnership of 151 made the previous season by Bell-Drummond and Sam Northeast and the county's highest opening partnership of 150 scored between Bell-Drummond and Denly, also in 2016.

Individual batting records 
Six batsmen have scored centuries for Kent in Twenty20 cricket, with one, Joe Denly, doing so five times. Ten players have scored more than 1,000 runs for the county in the format with Denly recording the two highest individual scores in 2017 with 116 not out made against Surrey at The Oval in July followed by a score of 127 made against Essex at Chelmsford in August.

Andrew Symonds scored Kent's first T20 century in 2004, scoring 112 runs against Middlesex at Maidstone. Symonds scored his century in 34 balls, at the time a record for the fastest century in T20 cricket. As of June 2021 it is the fourth quickest century scored in top-level T20 matches worldwide and the fastest scored in the UK. The other Kent centurions in T20 matches are Azhar Mahmood, Sam Northeast, Daniel Bell-Drummond and, most recently, Zak Crawley.

 Highest individual score: 127 Joe Denly vs Essex at Chelmsford, 2017
 Most runs in a season: 641 Sam Northeast, 2015
 Most career runs: 3,950 Joe Denly, 2004–present

Individual bowling records 
Five bowlers have taken five wickets in a Twenty20 innings for Kent, Wahab Riaz in 2011, Mitchell Claydon in 2013, Adam Milne in 2017, Imran Qayyum in 2019 and, most recently, Matt Milnes in 2021. Adam Milne's five wickets for the cost of 11 runs in against Somerset in 2017 is the best bowling analysis for a Kent player. Wahab Riaz, Ryan McLaren, Matt Coles, Joe Denly and Adam Milne have all taken hat-tricks for Kent in the format, McLaren doing so in the 2007 Twenty20 Cup final against Gloucestershire, Kent's first Twenty20 final success. Wahab Riaz's hat-trick was taken in 2011 against Gloucestershire as part of his five-wicket haul, Coles took his in 2017 against Middlesex and Denly, primarily a batsman, took his in 2018 against Surrey in a match in which he also scored a century. Milne's hat-trick was taken from the final three balls of a match against Surrey in 2021. Only James Tredwell and Darren Stevens have taken more than 100 T20 wickets in total for the county as of June 2021.

 Best bowling: 5/11 Adam Milne vs Somerset at Taunton, 2017
 Most wickets in a season: 23 Yasir Arafat, 2008
 Most career wickets: 119 James Tredwell, 2003–2017

See also
 List of Kent County Cricket Club first-class cricket records
 List of Kent County Cricket Club List A cricket records

References

External links
 Kent County Cricket Club website

Kemt Twenty20
Cricket in Kent
Lists of Twenty20 cricket records and statistics
Cricket